Philip Jönsson (born 28 March 1994) is a Swedish Paralympic sport shooter. He won the gold medal in the mixed 10m air rifle standing SH2 event at the 2020 Summer Paralympics held in Tokyo, Japan. This was also the first medal for Sweden at the 2020 Summer Paralympics.

He also represented Sweden at the 2016 Summer Paralympics held in Rio de Janeiro, Brazil.

References

External links
 

Living people
1994 births
People from Mariestad Municipality
Swedish male sport shooters
Shooters at the 2016 Summer Paralympics
Shooters at the 2020 Summer Paralympics
Medalists at the 2020 Summer Paralympics
Paralympic medalists in shooting
Paralympic gold medalists for Sweden
Paralympic shooters of Sweden
Sportspeople from Västra Götaland County
21st-century Swedish people